Farid Chaâl (born 3 July 1994 in Beni Douala) is an Algerian footballer who currently plays for Algerian Ligue Professionnelle 1 club MC Alger.

Club career
In July 2015, Chaâl was loaned out by MC Alger to USM El Harrach for the 2015–16 Algerian Ligue Professionnelle 1 season.

External links

References

1994 births
Algerian footballers
Algerian Ligue Professionnelle 1 players
Living people
MC Alger players
USM El Harrach players
People from Beni Douala
2015 Africa U-23 Cup of Nations players
Footballers at the 2016 Summer Olympics
Olympic footballers of Algeria
Association football goalkeepers
21st-century Algerian people
Algeria A' international footballers
2022 African Nations Championship players